The People's Liberation Army Special Operations Forces are the special forces of the People's Liberation Army (PLA), excluding the paramilitary People’s Armed Police (PAP) of The People’s Republic of China. The forces intended combat role is to be rapid-response units in the event of a limited regional war under high-tech conditions. They also carry out commando, counter-terrorism, and intelligence gathering operations. 

The building up of China's special forces represents a shift in the country's operational thinking, from an army-dominated force structure to emphasizing integrated joint operations, with a flexible elite force.

History 

The PLA's interest in modern special warfare was first noted in the mid-1980s when it was shifting its military stance from a "people's war" to "fighting a local war under hi-tech conditions." The PLA planners believed that the next war would be a short, fast-paced conflict on the periphery rather than a total war on Chinese territory, and that conventional infantry-orientated ground forces would no longer meet their requirements. Additionally, the PLA's combat experience from the 1979 and 1980s border conflicts with Vietnam, where Vietnamese special forces caused substantial trouble to the Chinese forces, demonstrated the value of special units.

On 23 December 2008, their first publicly known mission was to accompany three Chinese warships in protecting and escorting commercial ships against Somali pirates, in cooperation with other nations as part of a UN mandate.

Special operations units 

The special operations forces of PLA are under the administration of different branches of the military.
 
In the PLA Ground Force, each army group has its own special warfare brigade (特战旅/特战团). PLAGF Special Warfare units are similar to the US 75th Ranger Regiment in that they do not have the civil affairs and psychological warfare capabilities that the US Army Special Operations Command has. 

The Chinese Naval special operations force is a sub-branch of the PLA Navy Marine Corps. Units include the Marine Amphibious Reconnaissance Battalions/Regiments (海军陆战队两栖侦查营/团) and the Jiaolong Assault Team (or Sea Dragon Commandos, 蛟龙突击队), a unit similar to US Navy SEALs and US Marine Raiders. 

The People's Liberation Army Air Force has its own special operations force with airborne capability, which is a part of People's Liberation Army Airborne Corps]], the Leishen (Thundergod) Commando Airborne Force (雷神突击队).
 
The PLA Rocket Force has a special forces unit called "Blade Commandos" (利刃突击队), it is specialized in special reconnaissance and facility protection operations. The unit can provide intelligence gathering and special protection capabilities for the Rocket Force. 

The PLA Strategic Support Force also has special operations capable unit named "Counter-Terrorism Assault Unit"(战略支援部队反恐突击) in case a facility of the PLASSF is under terrorist attack.

 Beijing Military Region – "Oriental Sword (东方神剑)" is a PLA Ground Force SOF unit. All 3,000 soldiers in this unit can complete all types of operations and are regarded as the elite arm of the country.

 Beijing Military Region Special Forces Unit – "Arrow (响箭突击队)" is a PLA Ground Force SOF unit. Established in the early 1990s, this unit is equipped with high-tech equipment including unmanned aerial reconnaissance vehicles (UARVs), individual blast devices and handheld laser dazzling weapons.

 Guangzhou Military Region Special Forces Unit – "South Blade" or "South China Sword" (华南利剑) is a PLA Ground Force SOF unit. This unit was established in 1988 as the PLA's first special reconnaissance group. It was expanded in 2000 to become the first PLA special operations unit to be capable of air-, sea-, and land-operations, similar to U.S. Navy SEALs. Basic training for this unit includes cross-country running, climbing, swimming and shooting. The soldiers must also be familiar with operating 15 advanced technologies including GPS navigation, night vision, and photo reconnaissance.

 Chengdu Military Region Special Forces Unit – Falcon (西南猎鹰, not to be confused with the Falcon Commando Unit of the PAP, see below) is a PLA Ground Force SOF unit. Established in 1992, this unit is specialized in target locating and indicating, airborne insertion, sabotage and offensive strikes, and emergency evacuation. The unit was also used by Chengdu Military Region to experiment with new advanced concept equipment and tactics, including the digitized army soldier system and high-mobility land weapon platforms.

 Shenyang Military Region Special Forces Unit – "Siberian Tiger (东北虎)" is a PLA Ground Force SOF unit. This unit is trained to complete missions on the ground and in the air and water, as well as surviving in the wilderness alone or in small groups. The unit is said to place special focus on survival skills; it often breaks protocol by increasing this training by two-thirds, forcing soldiers to spend three to four months in difficult environments such as forests, mountains, deserts and grasslands with no man-made shelter or food. Soldiers in the unit are trained on multiple transport vehicles for roads, railroads, waterways, and in the air. Individual members of the unit have reportedly completed parachute landings more than 5,000 times and logged scuba diving training of more than 1,000 hours.

 Nanjing Military Region Special Forces Unit – Flying Dragon (飞龙突击队). This is the special land force of east China's Nanjing Military Region.

 Nanjing Military Region Special Forces Unit – Oscar (奥斯卡).

 Lanzhou Military Region Special Forces Unit – Night Tiger (夜老虎, also called Special Warfare Brigade of Peng Xuefeng, 雪枫特战旅). This unit has a long history, with its origins dating back to World War II. It is the home of China's first counter-terrorism unit, established in 2000.

 Jinan Military Region Special Forces Unit – Eagle. Soldiers from this unit are said to focus on training to enhance cardiovascular endurance, including being able to run at least 3,300 meters in under 12 minutes. They also reportedly engage in hand-to-hand combat training and the traditional Chinese health and martial arts practice of Qigong. Soldiers of the Eagle special force can complete sea-air-land operations, in a similar way to the U.S. Navy SEALs.

 The Southwest China Falcon is a special forces unit in Sichuan. It is also known as Hunting Leopards.

 The Leishen (Thundergod) Commando Airborne Force (雷神突击队) is a People's Liberation Army Air Force SOF unit. It is trained for reconnaissance operations for the PLA's airborne units. It is capable of performing strategic deterrence, combat assault, and task operations under IT-based conditions. Members of this unit recently attended the Golden Owl-2015 International Competition of Special Forces held in Kazakhstan, and won first place. Representatives also attended the Russia International Army Games in 2015 where they took first place in the Airborne Platoon competition. Ten teams, from Kazakhstan, Belarus, China, Russia, Indonesia and Singapore, attended the competition.

 Sea Dragon (蛟龙突击队 or literally translated as Jiaolong Assault Team) is a unit of the People's Liberation Army Navy Marine Corps. Members of this force are equipped with black uniforms. Its first publicly known mission was to accompany three Chinese warships in protecting and escorting commercial ships against Somali pirates in December 2008, in cooperation with other nations as part of a UN mandate. Since then, the unit has participated in anti-piracy missions in the Gulf of Aden for over 300 days. Sea Dragon's Jiaolong Assault Team helped evacuate 225 foreign nationals and almost 600 Chinese citizens from Yemen's southern port of Aden during late March 2015, during the Yemeni Civil War.

Weapons 
Most weapons used by Chinese SOF are made domestically, but there are foreign weapons in the inventory of PLA and PAP Special Operations Forces.

Assault Rifles 
Norinco QBZ-95/QBZ-95-1 assault rifle: standard service rifle of the PLA and PAP forces.

Norinco QBZ-95B-1 carbine:  the compact version of QBZ-95-1, used by PLAN Marines and PAP Falcon Commandos.

Norinco QBZ-03 assault rifle: conventional layout assault rifle.

Norinco QBZ-191 assault rifle: conventional layout assault rifle, new standard service rifle using replacing QBZ-95 for the PLA and PAP forces.

Norinco QBZ-56C carbine: compact version of the Type 56 assault rifle (Chinese copy of AK-47/AKM), being phased out.

Norinco CQ Type-A carbine: Chinese copy of M4A1 carbine. Used by PAP personnel in the 2017 Annual Warrior Competition in Amman, Jordan.

Norinco QTS-11 individual integrated combat system: an OICW type weapon, used by Jiaolong Assault Team members.

Norinco QBS-06: underwater assault rifle, copy of Soviet APS rifle.

Sub-Machine Guns 
Jianshe QCW-05/QCQ-05 submachine gun: 5.8mm bullpup personal defence weapon.

Type 85 suppressed SMG: an SMG with integral suppressor, will be replaced by QCW-05.

Norinco Type 79 SMG: 7.62mm sub-machinegun based on AK platform.

Jianshe CS/LS 7 SMG: 9mm sub-machinegun.

Jianshe CS/LS 6 SMG: sub-machinegun with high-capacity drum magazine.

Pistols 
Norinco QSZ-92: 5.8×21mm semi-automatic pistol.

Norinco QSZ-92A: improved version of QSZ-92, fires 9x19mm cartridge.

Norinco QX-4: multi-caliber modular semi-auto pistol.

Precision Rifles 
Norinco QBU-88: 5.8mm bullpup designated marksman rifle.

CS/LR 19: Chinese copy of SVD sniper rifle with tactical rail interface system.

Norinco QBU-191: designated marksman version of QBZ-191.

CS/LR4: 7.62x51mm bolt-action sniper rifle.

CS/LR3: 5.8x42mm version of CS/LR 4.

Remington Model 700: used by PAP Falcon Commando Unit.

SIG Sauer SSG 3000 sniper rifle: used by PAP Falcon Commando Unit.

Orsis T-5000 sniper rifle: used by Police Tactical Unit of Beijing.

Norinco QBU-10: 12.7x108mm semi-auto long range scoped rifle with digital controlled aiming device.

Zijiang M99: semi-auto 12.7x108mm long range scoped rifle.

Shotguns 
Hawk Type 97-1/97-2: pump-action shotgun based on Remingtom 870.

Norinco QBS-09: semi automatic combat shotgun.

Light Support Weapons 
Norinco QJB-95/95-1 LSW: light support weapon version of QBZ-95/95-1 rifles.

Norinco QJY-88 GPMG: 5.8mm belt-fed light machine gun.

Norinco CS/LM 8: 5.56x45mm light machine gun, unlicensed copy of FN Minimi.

Grenade Launchers 
GLU-16: 35mm "sniper grenade launcher".

QLZ-87: automatic grenade launcher.

QLG-91: 35mm underbarrel grenade launcher for QBZ-95 rifle.

Awards 
 2009 international military competitions in Slovakia – 8-first places, 6-second places in 13 individual competition events.
 Third place in the 2010 Sniper World Cup and first place in the 2011 Sniper World Cup.
 Best overall performance at the fifth and sixth Warrior Competition, organized by the Jordan Armed Forces at the King Abdullah II Special Operations Training Centre.
 Chinese Special Forces took first place at the 2013 fifth International Warrior Competition, organized by the Jordan Armed Forces at the King Abdullah II Special Operations Training Centre.
 Chinese Special Forces took first, second, and fourth place at 2014 Olympics for Elite Warriors. 
 Chinese Thundergod (Leishen) Commando Airborne troops participated in the Golden Owl-2015 International Competition of Special Forces held in Kazakhstan, taking first place. They also attended the Russia International Army Games in 2015 where they took first place in the "Airborne Platoon" competition.
 China's Sky Sword Unit placed first in the ninth edition of the 2017 Annual Warrior Competition in Amman, Jordan. China's Falcon Commando Unit placed third overall in the competition. Thirty-one teams from seventeen nations participated in the competition.
 China' Snow Leopards team placed second in the tenth edition of the 2018 Annual Warrior Competition in Amman, Jordan.

References

External links 
 Sinodefence.com

Military units and formations of the People's Republic of China